Upo or UPO may refer to:

Organizations
United Partisan Organization, Jewish resistance organization in the Vilna Ghetto
Universidad Pablo de Olavide, a university in Seville, Spain
United Planning Organization, Washington's community action agency for Capital Area Food Bank

Musical groups
U.P.O., a post-grunge band from Los Angeles, California
Ural Philharmonic Orchestra, from Yekaterinburg, Russia
Urbana Pops Orchestra,  Urbana, Illinois, United States

Other uses
Upo, Shita people, Ethiopia
Upo Wetland, Changnyeong County, South Korea
Unpentoctium, an unsynthesized chemical element
Unit Post Orderlies, see history of the British Army postal service
ÇOMÜ Ulupınar Observatory, Turkey
Upo, the Cebuano name for calabash